Pedro Rosalí (c. 1824 – c. 1894) was Mayor of Ponce, Puerto Rico, from 4 February 1874 until 5 May 1874.

See also

 List of Puerto Ricans
 List of mayors of Ponce, Puerto Rico

References

External links
 Guardia Civil española (c. 1898) (Includes military ranks in 1880s Spanish Empire.)

Further reading
 Ramon Marin. Las Fiestas Populares de Ponce. Editorial Universidad de Puerto Rico. 1994. 
 Fay Fowlie de Flores. Ponce, Perla del Sur: Una Bibliográfica Anotada. Second Edition. 1997. Ponce, Puerto Rico: Universidad de Puerto Rico en Ponce. p. 335. Item 1667. 
 Villa de Ponce. Presupuesto municipal del ilustre Ayuntamiento de la Villa de Ponce para el año económico de 1874 a 1875. Ponce, Puerto Rico: H. Lara -- Imprenta Nueva, 1874. (Biblioteca del Congreso (Washington, D.C.; Colegio Universitario Tecnológico de Ponce, CUTPO [fotocopia])

1820s births
1890s deaths
Year of death uncertain
Year of birth uncertain